Polyptychus enodia is a moth of the family Sphingidae. It is present in Gabon and West Congo.

References

Polyptychus
Moths described in 1889
Insects of Cameroon
Insects of the Democratic Republic of the Congo
Fauna of the Central African Republic
Fauna of the Republic of the Congo
Fauna of Gabon
Moths of Africa